Winkelmatten is a suburb of Zermatt, Switzerland. It was once a separate small hamlet, but as Zermatt has grown it has become incorporated within the greater conurbation.

Villages in Valais
Zermatt